Minchinbury was an electoral district of the Legislative Assembly in the Australian state of New South Wales from 1988 to 1991, which included the suburb of Minchinbury. Its only member was Anne Cohen, a member of the Liberal Party. It was replaced by Badgerys Creek.

Members for Minchinbury

Election results

1988

References

Former electoral districts of New South Wales
Constituencies established in 1988
1988 establishments in Australia
Constituencies disestablished in 1991
1991 disestablishments in Australia